Vitali Aleksandrovich Baranov (born 25 January, 1980) is a retired Russian professional football player.

Career
He played his only Russian Premier League game on the last game day of the 2000 season in a 4–3 victory by PFC CSKA Moscow over FC Lokomotiv Moscow, saving a penalty kick by Oleg Teryokhin.

After he retired from playing, Baranov become a football coach. He was appointed the goalkeeper's coach for FC Zenit-Izhevsk in 2018.

References

External links
 

1980 births
Sportspeople from Izhevsk
Living people
Russian footballers
Russia under-21 international footballers
Russian Premier League players
PFC CSKA Moscow players
FC Khimki players
FC Izhevsk players
Association football goalkeepers